Ejuan Amir Price (born January 30, 1993) is a former American football outside linebacker. He played college football at Pittsburgh.

College career
Price played college football for the University of Pittsburgh.

Professional career

Los Angeles Rams
Price was drafted by the Los Angeles Rams in the seventh round with the 234th overall pick in the 2017 NFL Draft. He was waived by the Rams on December 2, 2017, and re-signed to the practice squad. He signed a reserve/future contract with the Rams on January 8, 2018.

On September 1, 2018, Price was waived by the Rams.

Baltimore Ravens
On January 2, 2019, Price signed a reserve/future contract with the Baltimore Ravens. He was waived on May 14, 2019.

References

External links
Pittsburgh Panthers bio
 Los Angeles Rams bio

1993 births
Living people
People from Rankin, Pennsylvania
American football linebackers
American football defensive ends
Baltimore Ravens players
Los Angeles Rams players
Pittsburgh Panthers football players
Players of American football from Pennsylvania
Sportspeople from the Pittsburgh metropolitan area